Parthenodes paralleloidalis is a moth in the family Crambidae.

References

Moths described in 1917
Musotiminae